John Doward Sanford (June 23, 1917 – January 4, 2005) was a first baseman in Major League Baseball who played his entire career for the Washington Senators. He was born in Chatham, Virginia. 
 
Basically a line-drive hitter and a fine defensive player, Sanford was one of many ballplayers who interrupted their careers to serve during World War II. He signed with the Senators out of the University of Richmond, where he lettered in baseball, basketball, football and track.

Sanford made his American League debut on August 24, 1940 at Griffith Stadium. In his debut, he left six men on base in a two-run loss. His -0.437 win probability added is the lowest of any debutant in Major League history. Sanford played for the Washington Senators in the 1940 and 1941 seasons as a backup for Zeke Bonura and Mickey Vernon at first base. He served in the U.S. Air Force from 1941 to 1946, playing and coaching on baseball teams there, then returned to major league action briefly in 1946.

In a three-season career, Sanford was a .231 hitter (32-for-153) with 13 runs and 11 RBI in 47 games, including four doubles and four triples without home runs or stolen bases.

Sanford died in Greensboro, North Carolina, at the age of 87.

References

External links
Baseball Reference statistics
Retrosheet
Baseball in Wartime
Historic Baseball obituary

1917 births
2005 deaths
American men's basketball players
Augusta Tigers players
Barton Bulldogs baseball coaches
Baseball players from Virginia
Charlotte Hornets (baseball) players
Chattanooga Lookouts players
Danville Leafs players
Elon Phoenix athletic directors
Elon Phoenix baseball coaches
Fayetteville Highlanders players
Little Rock Travelers players
Los Angeles Angels (minor league) players
Major League Baseball first basemen
People from Chatham, Virginia
Portsmouth Merrimacs players
Raleigh Capitals players
Reidsville Luckies players
Richmond Spiders baseball players
Richmond Spiders football players
Richmond Spiders men's basketball players
United States Army Air Forces personnel of World War II
Washington Senators (1901–1960) players
Hargrave Military Academy alumni